{{DISPLAYTITLE:Glycerol-3-phosphate dehydrogenase (NAD(P)+)}}

In enzymology, a glycerol-3-phosphate dehydrogenase [NAD(P)+] is an enzyme that catalyzes the chemical reaction

sn-glycerol 3-phosphate + NAD(P)+  glycerone phosphate + NAD(P)H + H+

The 3 substrates of this enzyme are sn-glycerol 3-phosphate, NAD+, and NADP+, whereas its 4 products are glycerone phosphate, NADH, NADPH, and H+.

This enzyme belongs to the family of oxidoreductases, specifically those acting on the CH-OH group of donor with NAD+ or NADP+ as acceptor. The systematic name of this enzyme class is sn-glycerol-3-phosphate:NAD(P)+ 2-oxidoreductase. Other names in common use include L-glycerol-3-phosphate:NAD(P)+ oxidoreductase, glycerol phosphate dehydrogenase (nicotinamide adenine dinucleotide, (phosphate)), glycerol 3-phosphate dehydrogenase (NADP+), and glycerol-3-phosphate dehydrogenase [NAD(P)+]. This enzyme participates in glycerophospholipid metabolism.

Structural studies

As of late 2007, only one structure has been solved for this class of enzymes, with the PDB accession code .

References

 
 
 
 

EC 1.1.1
NADPH-dependent enzymes
NADH-dependent enzymes
Enzymes of known structure